This is the list of notorious markets compiled by the Office of the United States Trade Representative, which claims that they are markets where large-scale intellectual property infringement takes place.

Current

Previously listed
Markets listed here were previously included in various reports, but were not included in subsequent reports. The reason for delisting is not always known.

See also
 Comparison of BitTorrent sites
 Comparison of YouTube downloaders

References

Reports

Notorious markets